Sir William de Thorpe (died 27 May 1361) was an English lawyer who was Chief Justice of the King's Bench from 26 November 1346 to 26 October 1350. As a clerk of this court, he was assaulted on one occasion in 1318, when his enemies allegedly urinated on him. He was knighted in 1345, at the same time as he was made justice of the King's Bench.

Thorpe accumulated great estates, particularly in Lincolnshire, and his wealth must have derived primarily from bribes and maintenance. In 1350, he was imprisoned and condemned to hanging and confiscation of all property. By 1351, however, he had been pardoned and had his property restored. The next year, he was made baron of the exchequer and also held various other commissions. In 1357, he was excommunicated for non-appearance at the trial of Thomas de Lisle, Bishop of Ely, in Avignon.

He appears to have had a son by the same name.

References

Sources
Richard W. Kaeuper, 'Thorp, Sir William (d. 1361)', Oxford Dictionary of National Biography, Oxford University Press, 2004 accessed 9 Aug 2006

14th-century English judges
People excommunicated by the Catholic Church
Lord chief justices of England and Wales
1361 deaths
Year of birth unknown